John Hatch (born February 23, 1962 in Calgary, Alberta) is a former basketball player from Canada, who played for Canada men's national basketball team.  He is a two-time Olympian (1984 and 1988).

References
 sports-reference

1962 births
Living people
Basketball players at the 1984 Summer Olympics
Basketball players at the 1988 Summer Olympics
Basketball people from Alberta
Canadian men's basketball players
Olympic basketball players of Canada
Sportspeople from Calgary
St. Francis Xavier University alumni
Universiade medalists in basketball
Universiade gold medalists for Canada
Medalists at the 1983 Summer Universiade
SAM Basket players
Canadian expatriate basketball people in Belgium
Canadian expatriate basketball people in Switzerland